Yashar Nuri (September 3, 1951 – November 22, 2012) was an Azerbaijani film, television and theater actor and a member of the Azerbaijan State Academic Drama Theatre. He appeared in more than fifty Azerbaijani and Soviet era films, as well as more than 100 television and stage roles.

Biography 
He was born in the family of actor Mamedsadig Nuriyev and first appeared on stage at the age of 11, playing the role of Tapdyga in the play "Toy Kimindir?" ("Whose wedding is this?") At the Azerbaijan State Theater of Musical Comedy. While studying at school, he was a child and youth programmer, participated in drama circles.
In 1968 he graduated from secondary school No. 173 in Baku and entered the faculty of film acting of the Azerbaijan State Institute of Arts for the course of Rza Takhmasib and Aligeydar Alekperov. During his studies he played roles in several productions, including "Sevil" (Balash), "Wedding" (Salmanov) and "Guilty Without Guilt" (Neznamov).
In 1972, after graduating from the institute, he served in the army for a year and, having returned, worked as an actor in the educational theater of the Institute. In 1974, at the invitation of the chief director of the Academic National Drama Theater, he was accepted into the acting company of the collective. 
In 1975, he married Rakhime khanum, who was a doctor. They had two daughters (Ulkar, Ulviyya).  He was sick for a long time and in 2011 was in intensive care. Yashar Nuri died on the morning of November 22, 2012 in Baku.

Creation 
Nuri starred in about 50 feature films and more than 100 television productions. Many of the television dramas in which he starred in the main role, entered the gold fund of Azerbaijani television. Among them,"When Roads Meet"( Yollar görüşəndə), "Life Paths" (Ömrün yolları), "Houses Along" (Evləri köndələn yar), ("The Disturbed Piano" ) and "Gatarda" ("In the train")s. He appears in the films "Bayin Ogurlanmasy" ("The Abduction of the Bridegroom"), "Yaramaz" ("Bastard"), "Jokhlama" ("Check"), "Yol Echvalates" ("Road Accident"). In addition to the theater, Yashar Nuri collaborated with radio. He was a participant in humorous radio programs ("Good Morning", "Evening of Laughter"). In the film studio "Azerbaijanfilm" he voiced local films and dubbed foreign films. Y. Nuri was also the director of a number of films and performances. He was the director of the movie "Thank you" (Спасибо).

Anniversaries 
Y. Nuri's jubilees are always held solemnly. In 1981, in the 30-year anniversary of Y. Nuri, he was awarded the title of People's Artist of the Azerbaijan SSR for the first time. In 1991, for his role in the film "Bastard" received a state award. In 1996, for the 45th birthday of the actor, in 2001, for the 50th anniversary, feature films "Yashar of Our Scene" ("səhnəmizin Yaşarı"), "Yashar is whom he is" (Yashar olduğu kimi) were made. In 2011, the 60th anniversary of Yashar Nuri was celebrated at the Azerbaijan State Academic National Drama Theater.
In 1989, he was named a People's Artist of Azerbaijan, as the country was part of the Soviet Union at the time, and awarded the Shohrat Order. Born in Baku on September 3, 1951, Nuri died on November 22, 2012, at the age of 61.

Filmography 
 1974 - Winds blow in Baku (Bakıda küləklər əsir) - soldier, voice
 1975 - Apple as an apple (Alma almaya bənzər) - Mehti, voice
 1975 -Four Sunday (Dörd bazar günü) - Seyran
 1976 - Look for us in the mountains (Bizi dağlarda axtarın) - Geologist
 1976 - Mesozoic history (Mezozoy əhvalatı) - Rauf
 1977 - Birthday (Ad günü) - Eldar
 1977 - The Lion left the house (Şir evdən getdi) - Dad
 1983 - Music teacher (Musiqi müəllimi) - Bashir
 1983 - Hash with music - translator
 1985 - The bridegroom was stolen (Bəyin oğurlanması) - Israfil
 1987 - Sureia - Musa
 1987 - The Devil Under the Windshield (Şeytan göz qabağında)
 1989 - Bastard (Yaramaz) - Mashalla
 1990 - Diversion (Təxribat) - Rahimov
 1990 - The day of execution (Qətl günü) - Mahmud
 1991 - Gazelkhan - Director
 1991 - The Window- Nasib
 1997 - All for the Better (Hər şey yaxşılığa doğru) - Abdulgani
 1999 - How wonderful this world is (Nə gözəldir bu dünya...) - director of a psychiatric hospital
 2000 - Bremen Town Musicians & Co-Guard of the King
 2003 - The Black Mark - The Pilot
 2003 - Mähällä 
 2003 - National bomb producer (Milli bomba) - Abdulgani
 2005 - Template: Be a man

Ranks and awards 
 1981 - Honored Artist of the Azerbaijan SSR.
 1989 - People's Artist of the Azerbaijan SSR.
 1991 - State Prize of the Azerbaijan SSR (for his role in the film ("The Git").
 1992, 1996 - the prize "Qızıl dərviş" ("The Golden Dervish").
 2011 - the order "Şöhrət" ("Glory").

References

External links
 

1951 births
2012 deaths
Azerbaijani male film actors
Azerbaijani male stage actors
Azerbaijani male television actors
People's Artists of Azerbaijan
Soviet Azerbaijani people
Actors from Baku
Burials at II Alley of Honor